Ohio's 27th senatorial district has historically been based in metro Akron.  It now consists of Wayne County, as well as, portions of both Summit and Stark counties. It encompasses Ohio House districts 1, 37, and 38.  It has a Cook PVI of R+4.  The district was represented by the Senate President from 1978 to 1979 with Senator Oliver Ocasek.  Its Ohio Senator is Republican Kristina Roegner.  She resides in Hudson located in Summit County.

List of senators

References

External links
Ohio's 27th district senator at the 130th Ohio General Assembly official website

Ohio State Senate districts